Tess Allemann (born 7 April 1998) is a Swiss ice hockey player for SCL Tigers and the Swiss national team.

She participated at the 2017 IIHF Women's World Championship.

References

External links

1998 births
Living people
Swiss women's ice hockey forwards
People from Oberaargau District
Olympic ice hockey players of Switzerland
Ice hockey players at the 2018 Winter Olympics
Sportspeople from the canton of Bern
21st-century Swiss women